Miklós Sugár (born 2 July 1952) is a Hungarian conductor, music educator, and composer. He is the son of the composer Rezső Sugár. He was born in Budapest and studied at the Ferenc Liszt Academy of Music with Kórodi Andrásné and Emilnél Petrovich.

After completing his studies, he took a position from 1978-84 as the Army Art Ensemble Symphony Orchestra conductor. In 1978 he also took a position teaching at the Theater and Film Academy in Budapest, where he worked until 1991. From 1984-88 he led the Békéscsabai Symphony Orchestra, and from 1988-90 worked as an editor for Hungarian Radio's music department. In 1991 he took the position of National Philharmonic's manager. The same year, he was a co-founder of EAR, a contemporary electro-acoustic ensemble. Between 1991–99, he worked with the Alba Regia Symphony Orchestra.

From 1979-87 Sugár was a member of the Hungarian Composers 'Association of Young Composers' Group, and from 1983-87 served as secretary to the organization.

Honors and awards
1981, scholarship from the Albert Szirmai Foundation
1984-85, Kodály scholarship
1985, Budapest Spring Festival, 3rd International Zeneszerzőverseny finishers
1989, Arezzo Choral Competition Special Prize-winning composer
1991, Hungarian Radio KÓTA művéért's Gloria Award.
1991-92, Soros Fellow
1991, John von Neumann Society for Competition of Electroacoustic (3 awards)
1992, Ferenc Erkel Prize
1993, Lanczos-Szekfu Foundation honoree
1989, 1990 and 1994, Les Atelier UPIC scholarship, Paris
1999, Akademie der Künste Berlin Scholarshi
2001, Vox-electronica award as a member of EAR

Discography
Sugár's works have been recorded and issued on media including:
Mosaic, Musica agile, Dissolves, Ballad, Chorea, Rencontres, 1988 Hungaroton SLPX 12970 LP
Concert for Cimbalom, 1993 Preludio PRECD 9304 CD
Fanfár / Fanfare, 1995 ARITMIA Hungaroton HCD 31 624 CD
Contemporary Hungarian music for trumpet and harp, 1995 Hungaroton HCD 31 734 CD
Vizek völgyek harangok / Water, valley, bells, 1997 MR HEAR Studio CD
Magyar hangtájak / Hungarian Soundscapes, Álmok / Dreams - részletek / excerpts, 1997 MR Rt HEAR Studio CD
EAR movements: Short story, Fluctus, Models, Percupicsy, Iris, 1999 Hungaroton HCD 31 788 CD
Lied, Pater noster, 1999 Hungaroton HCD 31 840 CD
Dreams, 2000 Hungaroton HCD 31 868 CD
Trio miniatures, 2001 Hungaroton HCD 31 997 CD
After storm, Songs on verses by Béla Kondor, Luxatio, Three songs on Poems by Morgenstern, No. 2, French songs on Poems by S. Beckett, Miniatures, 2003 Hungaroton HCD 32 180
Adoramus, Exultate, 2004 Allegro Thaler MZA-069
Fanfár, 2004 Hungaroton HCD 32251
Mosaic, Musica agile, Dissolves, Réminiscences, Cloud variations, Ballad, Chorea, Rencontres, 2005 Hungaroton HCD 32326
Art Duo No. 2, 2005 Hungaroton HCD 32347
Pages dessinées, Birds of the crater, 2006 Hungaroton HCD 32449

References

1952 births
20th-century classical composers
Franz Liszt Academy of Music alumni
Hungarian classical composers
Hungarian male classical composers
Hungarian conductors (music)
Male conductors (music)
Living people
Musicians from Budapest
20th-century conductors (music)
21st-century conductors (music)